Montreuil, sometimes unofficially referred to as Montreuil-sous-Bois, is a commune in the eastern suburbs of Paris, France. With a population of 111,367 as of 2020, Montreuil is the third most populous suburb of Paris after Boulogne-Billancourt and Saint-Denis. It is located north of Paris's Bois de Vincennes (in the 12th arrondissement), on the border with Val-de-Marne.

Name
The name Montreuil was recorded for the first time in a royal edict of 722 as Monasteriolum, meaning "little monastery" in Medieval Latin. The settlement of Montreuil started as a group of houses built around a small monastery.

History
Under the reigns of Louis XIV and Louis XVI the "Peach Walls" which provided the royal court with the fruits were located in Montreuil. It was also later home to the Lumière brothers and George Méliès whose workshops were located in lower Montreuil.

On 1 January 1860, the city of Paris was enlarged by annexing neighboring communes. On that occasion, the commune of Charonne was disbanded and divided between the city of Paris, Montreuil, and Bagnolet. Montreuil received a small part of the territory of Charonne.

Today Montreuil is divided into several districts:

 Le bas Montreuil (which joins together the old workshops (bordering on Saint-Mandé), the marché aux puces (bordering on Paris, carries of Montreuil),
The Mairie (town hall) (the malls, la croix de Chavaux, the mairie, and the Church of St Peter and St Paul),
 La Noue (parc des Guilands, city of du Val, Robespierre, bordering on Bagnolet),
 Le Bel Air (Jean Moulin housing estate, park des Beaumonts, city of Bel Air, city of Grand Pechers),
 La Boissière (all the north of Montreuil including parc Montreau and parc des Beaumonts, bordering on Romainville, Noisy-le-Sec, Rosny-sous-Bois and Fontenay-sous-Bois).

Main artistic heritage
 Decorations (ceramics and frescoes) in the state school "Voltaire" by Maurice Boitel (1954).
 Many definitive street art murals on several buildings of the city, like the tribute to Frantz Fanon, French psychiatrist and philosopher from the French overseas department of Martinique (boulevard Théophile Sueur). 
 "Au temps d'harmonie", pointillist painting from famous 19th century French painter Paul Signac, in the town hall.
 Polyptych (enamels), in the cathedral entrance of the Georges Méliès student residence by Guillaume Bottazzi.

Heraldry

Geography

Climate

Montreuil has a oceanic climate (Köppen climate classification Cfb).

Demographics

Population

Immigration

Montreuil's inhabitants often exaggeratedly nickname the town the "second Malian town after Bamako", or sometimes "Mali-sous-Bois" or "Bamako-sur-Seine" even if the Seine doesn't cross the town.

Administration
The mayor of Montreuil is the member of Parti communiste français Patrice Bessac, who was elected on the second round of 2014 municipal elections, defeating the former ex-Communist mayor Jean-Pierre Brard in a four-way second round. He was re-elected in the first round of the 2020 elections with 51.34% votes, though with 33.67% participation (down from 53.11% in the 2014 election) due to the COVID-19 crisis (which also caused a delay of the 2nd turn in other cities).

The city is divided into two cantons: canton of Montreuil-1 and canton of Montreuil-2.

Economy

Video game company Ubisoft has its corporate head office in Montreuil. The Air France Paris office (of Air France-KLM) is in Montreuil.

Education
The commune's educational services are operated out of the Opale B Administrative Building. Montreuil has eight collèges, three lycées, two lycées techniques, and the IUT of the University of Paris 8.

Senior high schools/sixth form colleges:
 Lycée Eugénie-Cotton
 Lycée Jean Jaurès
 Lycée Condorcet

The Montreuil Library (Bibliothèque de Montreuil) consists of the Robert-Desnos Central Library, the Daniel-Renoult Library, the Colonel-Fabien Library, and the Paul-Eluard Library. Robert-Desnos, in a park near the commune's town hall, is the largest library in the commune. It houses a music library and Internet access points. Daniel-Renoult, near Montreau Park, serves the Montreau-Ruffins Théophile Sueur community. Colonel-Fabien, in the Ramenas-Fabien-Léo Lagrange community, is near the Intercommunal Hospital. Paul-Eluard is near the La Grande Porte shopping centre and is within  of the Robespierre Paris Métro station and Rue de Paris.

Notable residents and personalities

Pierre de Montreuil, famous 13th century architect, died in 1267 in Paris
Gaston-Auguste Schweitzer, sculptor
Djamel Abdoun, Algerian footballer who played at the 2010 FIFA World Cup
Mehdi Abeid, Algerian footballer
Oumar Bakari, footballer
Rosette Bir, sculptor
Sacha Boey, footballer
Jacques Brel, singer/songwriter/actor
Souarata Cisse, basketball player
Yehvann Diouf, Senegalese Footballer
Olivier Dacourt, footballer
Emmanuel Flipo, artist
Pape Gueye, footballer
Sikou Niakate, footballer
Elisha Owusu, footballer
Mamadou Samassa, footballer
Tignous, cartoonist and activist killed in the Charlie Hebdo shooting
Élodie Bouchez, actress 
Henri Decaë, cinematographer
Nicolas Aithadi, Visual Effects, Guardians of the Galaxy
Jean Delannoy, director
Émile Reynaud, director
Abel Thermeus, footballer
Frédéric Verger, writer
Christophe Guilluy, geographer
Helno (Noël Rota) (1963-1993), singer with Lucrate Milk, Bérurier Noir & Les Négresses Vertes
Adèle Haenel, actress
Ethan Mbappé, footballer
Warren Zaïre-Emery, footballer

Transport
Montreuil is served by three stations on Paris Métro Line 9: Robespierre, Croix de Chavaux, and Mairie de Montreuil.

There are several new Métro (Line 11 - Montreuil-Hôpital) and tramway (extension of the T1 tramway) stations under construction. The region is also working on the extension of the Métro Line 1 to Val-de-Fontenay, with a possible new station in the East of Montreuil (Grands Pêchers).

International relations

Montreuil is twinned with Cottbus, Brandenburg, Germany and a few other towns and cities of Africa, Asia and Europe.

See also 
 Hornec gang
 Gaston-Auguste Schweitzer Birthplace of this sculptor
 Pierre de Montreuil
 Musée de l'Histoire vivante

References

External links

 Official website 

Communes of Seine-Saint-Denis
Cities in Île-de-France
Cities in France